Preparatory school or prep school may refer to:

Schools
Preparatory school (United Kingdom), an independent school preparing children aged 8–13 for entry into fee-charging independent schools, usually public schools
College-preparatory school, in the United States, a high or secondary school, either private or public, preparing students aged 14–18 for higher education at an elite college or university
Classe préparatoire aux grandes écoles, two-years’ intensive higher-education schooling when French students prepare to enter top-level schools (engineering, commerce, research, politics, etc.) via competitive examinations

Media
 Prep School, a 2015 American coming of age drama film, starring Carly Schroeder.

See also
Preschool, an establishment offering early childhood education before primary school
 Prepper (disambiguation)